The Vietnam War is a 10-part American television documentary series about the Vietnam War written by Geoffrey C. Ward and directed by Ken Burns and Lynn Novick. The first episode premiered on PBS on September 17, 2017. The script is by Geoffrey Ward, and the series is narrated by Peter Coyote. This series is one of the few PBS series to carry a TV-MA rating.

Production

The series cost around $30 million and took more than 10 years to make. It was produced by Ken Burns and Lynn Novick, who had previously collaborated on The War (2007), Baseball: The Tenth Inning (2010), and Prohibition (2011). The production companies were WETA-TV in Washington, D.C., and Burns' Florentine Films. It was funded in part by the National Endowment for the Humanities.

The series features interviews with 79 witnesses, including many Americans who fought in the war or opposed it as Anti-war protesters, as well as Vietnamese combatants and civilians from both the North and the South. Burns deliberately avoided "historians or other expert talking heads" and "onscreen interviews with polarizing boldfaced names like John Kerry, John McCain, Henry Kissinger and Jane Fonda." Instead, interviews were intended to provide a ground-up view of the War from the perspective of everyday people who lived through it. The third episode features an interview with retired UPI reporter Joseph L. Galloway, who was awarded a Bronze Star with "V" device for assisting with the wounded in the Battle of Ia Drang. Others interviewed include Vincent Okamoto, Karl Marlantes, and Tim O'Brien, author of The Things They Carried, a popular collection of linked short stories about the war.

The researchers for the film also accessed more than 24,000 photographs and examined 1,500 hours of archival footage. Within the series' 17-and-a-quarter-hours, there are scenes covering 25 battles, ten of which are detailed scenes documenting and describing the action from a number of perspectives.

Episodes

Interviewees 

Photographs and additional details about the interviewees can be seen on the  PBS website.

Home media 
The Vietnam War was released on Blu-ray and DVD on September 19, 2017. Extras include a 45-minute preview program, two segments on the lives of two of the series' participants, and deleted scenes. The series is also available for digital download, and can also be seen on Kanopy.

Book 
Accompanying the series is a 640-page companion book, The Vietnam War: An Intimate History by Geoffrey Ward and Ken Burns. Containing an introduction by Burns and Novick, it was published by Burns’ long-time publisher, Alfred A. Knopf, and released on September 5, 2017.

Reception 
Review aggregator Rotten Tomatoes gave the series an approval rating of 96% based on 49 reviews and a weighted average score of 9.36/10. The site's critical consensus states, "The Vietnam War revisits a dark chapter in American history with patience, grace, and a refreshing – and sobering – perspective informed by those who fought." Metacritic, another aggregator, gave the series a normalized score of 90 out of 100 based on 19 reviews, indicating "universal acclaim".

Washington Post opinion writer George Will noted that the series is "an example of how to calmly assess episodes fraught with passion and sorrow." He continues: "The combat films are extraordinary; the recollections and reflections of combatants and others on both sides are even more so, featuring photos of them then and interviews with many of them now." Will concludes his column by declaring the series a "masterpiece".

James Poniewozik of The New York Times wrote, "Will break your heart and win your mind."

Ken Burns anticipated politically motivated criticisms of the film from both the left and the right: "After The Vietnam War I'll have to lie low. A lot of people will think I'm a Commie pinko, and a lot of people will think I'm a right-wing nutcase, and that's sort of the way it goes."

San Jose Mercury News writer Tatiana Sanchez reported that some American and South Vietnamese veterans were "angry, [and] disappointed" with the documentary. They characterized it as a "betrayal". She writes: "veterans of the South Vietnamese military say they were largely left out of the narrative, their voices drowned out by the film's focus on North Vietnam and its communist leader, Ho Chi Minh. And many American veterans say that the series had several glaring omissions and focused too much on leftist anti-war protesters and soldiers who came to oppose the war."

Historian Mark Moyar published a review in which he criticized the series. Moyar felt that Burns and Novick overemphasized American battlefield defeats during 1966–1967 while glossing over the many victories. He also felt that Burns did not properly explain why American generals ordered their forces to fight so fiercely for seemingly meaningless hills; Moyar feels that engaging the Viet Cong in sparsely populated areas was a superior option to letting them draw near populated cities, where American airpower and artillery would require more careful use. Moyar also contended that Burns and Novick should have more strongly emphasized the amount of foreign aid that the North Vietnamese received from the Chinese and that both Vietnams were not entirely self-sufficient. He also believed that Nixon, a mercurial president who expressed many contradictory opinions, could not be taken entirely seriously in the tape excerpts used in the documentary wherein he appears to express a desire to cut South Vietnam loose immediately after the 1972 elections and the Paris Peace Accords, while the documentary let the excerpts stand as seeming fact.

Scholar Thomas Bass criticizes the film for its "urge toward healing and reconciliation, rather than truth". Bass's main objection is that the film perpetuates the narrative of the two Vietnams that justified U.S. involvement, arguing that "Southern Vietnam was never an independent country" and that Edward Lansdale played a role in that U.S. creation. He notes the prominent feature of Duong Van Mai Elliott in promoting this view, and the absence of a Daniel Ellsberg interview. Bass contends that this, together with the film's reliance on architects of the war such as "former generals, CIA agents and government officials, who are not identified by rank or title, but merely by their names and anodyne descriptions" is deemed as evidence of the film's "conservative credentials". Newsweek echoed Bass's objection that the movie obscures facts about the root causes of the war and its framing by the United States.

University of Chicago historian Mark Philip Bradley gave the mini-series a mixed review, saying "it is mainly unsuccessful at evoking the complexities of Vietnam’s past... We never hear a discussion of how American empire and the broader political, economic, and cultural complexities of the making of twentieth-century American global hegemony were bound up in the U.S. intervention in Vietnam. Questions of race and racism are only lightly addressed." But Bradley argued that the series was successful in telling "powerful individual stories that bring us into the quotidian dimensions of the American war in Vietnam in far more compelling ways than I have seen many other documentaries or books on Vietnam do."

Music

Score

Trent Reznor and Atticus Ross, current members of the band Nine Inch Nails, were tasked to score the series, and provide both original music and a compilation soundtrack of popular songs.

Soundtrack album
The PBS website describes the series as featuring "more than 120 iconic popular songs that define the era", including songs by then contemporary artists. Of these, 38 songs were selected for the series' soundtrack album, which was released on September 15, 2017.

Episode overview
Episode 1 includes Bob Dylan's "A Hard Rain's a-Gonna Fall", T-Bone Walker's "Mean Old World", and Rosemary Clooney's "Come On-A In My House". The Dylan song is reprised over the closing credits.
Episode 2 includes Miles Davis' "So What", Bill Doggett's "Honky Tonk (Part 1)", Woody Guthrie's "Dirty Overalls", The Ventures' "Walk, Don't Run", and Ben E. King's "Stand By Me". Sam Cooke's recording of "Mean Old World" (the same song performed by T-Bone Walker in the first episode) plays over the end credits.
Episode 3 includes Bob Dylan's "With God On Our Side", Buffy Saint-Marie's "Universal Soldier", Johnnie Wright's "Hello Vietnam", Phil Ochs' "I Ain't Marchin' Anymore", The Animals' "It's My Life", The Rolling Stones' "Play With Fire", Donovan's "The War Drags On", Johnny Cash's "Big River", Barry McGuire's "Eve of Destruction", Burl Ives' "Little Drummer Boy", and over the closing credits, "Turn! Turn! Turn!" by The Byrds.
Episode 4 includes The Staple Singers' "Masters of War", Wilson Pickett's "Mustang Sally", Nina Simone's “Backlash Blues”, Doug Wamble's "A Hard Rain's A-Gonna Fall", Howlin' Wolf's "Smokestack Lightning", Pete Seeger's "The Willing Conscript", Simon & Garfunkel's "The Sound of Silence", Donovan's "Sunshine Superman", Bob Dylan's "One Too Many Mornings", Simon & Garfunkel's "I Am A Rock", The Temptations' "Ain't Too Proud To Beg", Wayne Shorter "Footprints", Bob Dylan's "Talkin' World War III Blues", The Ventures' "Wild Child", Genesis's "Ravine" and Nine Inch Nails' "The Wretched". Simon & Garfunkel's "The Sound of Silence" played over the closing credits.
Episode 5 includes Jimi Hendrix's "Are You Experienced?", The Spencer Davis Group's "I'm a Man", Cream's "Strange Brew", Pete Seeger's "Waist Deep In The Big Muddy", and, over the closing credits, the Rolling Stones' "Paint It Black".
Episode 6 includes Janis Joplin & The Kozmic Blues Band's "Summertime" (live at Woodstock 1969), Jimi Hendrix's "Voodoo Chile", Vanilla Fudge's "You Keep Me Hangin' On", The Beatles' "Tomorrow Never Knows", Jefferson Airplane's "White Rabbit", Eddie Harris's "Live Right Now" and, over the closing credits, Procol Harum's "A Whiter Shade of Pale".
Episode 7 includes Simon & Garfunkel's "Blues Run the Game", The Beatles' "Revolution 1", Khanh Ly's "Uot Mi", Simon & Garfunkel's "Anji", The Rolling Stones' "Street Fighting Man", Buffalo Springfield's "For What It's Worth", Simon & Garfunkel's "Bookends Theme", Bob Dylan's "Don't Think Twice, It's All Right", Big Brother & the Holding Company's "Piece of My Heart", The Velvet Underground's "The Gift-Instrumental", Steppenwolf's "Magic Carpet Ride", The Sandals' "Lonely Road", and, over the closing credits, Otis Redding's "Tell the Truth".
Episode 8 includes Led Zeppelin's "Dazed and Confused", The Beatles' "While My Guitar Gently Weeps", The Box Tops' "The Letter", Three Dog Night's "Circle for a Landing", Creedence Clearwater Revival's "Bad Moon Rising", Country Joe McDonald's "I Feel Like I'm Fixing to Die Rag", Santana's "Soul Sacrifice", the Zombies' "Time of the Season", Otis Redding's "Respect", Santana's "Waiting", Nina Simone's "Come Ye", Bob Dylan's "Subterranean Homesick Blues", The Beatles' "Blackbird", Merle Haggard & the Strangers' "Okie from Muskogee", The Plastic Ono Band's "Give Peace a Chance", Cream's "Born Under a Bad Sign", Eddie Harris w/ "Live Right Now", B.B. King's "The Thrill is Gone", Bob Dylan's "Farewell, Angelina", Booker T. & the M.G.'s" w/ "Time is Tight", The Temptations' "Psychedelic Shack", Joni Mitchell's "Woodstock", and, over the closing credits, "Ohio" by Crosby, Stills, Nash & Young.
Episode 9 includes The Youngbloods' "Get Together", The Animals' "We Gotta Get Out of this Place", The Rolling Stones' "Gimme Shelter", Jefferson Airplane's "Embryonic Journey", The Bob Crewe Generation Orchestra's "Barbarella", Joan Baez's "Where Have All the Flowers Gone?", Link Wray's "Tail Dragger", Ray Charles' "America the Beautiful", Fairport Convention's "The Lord is in this Place", and, over the closing credits, Marvin Gaye's "What's Goin' On?".
Episode 10 includes "Kashmir" by Led Zeppelin, "All Along the Watchtower" by Jimi Hendrix, "Bridge Over Troubled Water" by Simon & Garfunkel, and, at the very end of the series, "Let It Be" by the Beatles.

See also
Vietnam: The Ten Thousand Day War, a 1980 Canadian television documentary about the Vietnam War which was produced by Michael Maclear
Vietnam: A Television History, a 1983 documentary series which was also produced by PBS

References

External links

2017 American television series debuts
2017 American television series endings
Documentary films about the Vietnam War
Documentary television series about the Cold War
Films directed by Ken Burns
Films scored by Atticus Ross
Films scored by Trent Reznor